WUDZ-LD, virtual channel 28 (UHF digital channel 24), is a low-powered Buzzr-affiliated television station licensed to Indianapolis, Indiana, United States. The station is owned by the DTV America Corporation. In late October 2019, the station was in the process of moving to physical channel 6 in the VHF band while retaining the Channel 28 virtual listing, but was instead assigned physical channel 24.

History 
The station’s construction permit was initially issued on December 13, 2010 under the calls of W28DZ-D. The current WUDZ-LD calls were assigned on December 7, 2015. The next day, the station signed on the air with Buzzr network programming on the main channels, making WUDZ the first station in the Terre Haute area to carry a multi-cast specialty network.

The station's owners moved this station to the Indianapolis market around May 14, 2016. An FCC query of WUDZ-LP reveals that the current antenna in use for the station is now located at 7701 Walnut Drive on that city's northwest side. Though the station remains officially licensed to Terre Haute, the station identification placard in use on-air denotes Indianapolis.

On October 18, 2019, WUDZ-LD went silent on RF Channel 28. According to the FCC Database, they are to move to RF Channel 6 so that another low-power station, WIPX-LD (channel 51), can take over on Channel 28. As of Friday, October 25, 2019, neither station was yet broadcasting on either channel. Buzzr and Sonlife have (at least temporarily) moved to sister station WSDI-LD on 30.3 and 30.5, respectively.

As of March 13, 2020, WUDZ was back on the air ending 5 months of dead air, but is instead on physical channel 24 with the display channel still being 28.

Digital channels
The station's digital signal is multiplexed:

Former Affiliations
28.2 - The Country Network (2016)
28.2 - Infomercials (2016)
28.2 - Heroes and Icons (2016-2022)
28.2 - OnTV4U (2022)
28.3 - Sonlife (-2022)
28.4 - Liquidation Channel (2016-2019)
28.4 - ShopHQ (2019-2020)
28.5 - QVC (2016-2020)
28.5 - LXTV (2020)
28.6 - QVC+ (2016-2020)
28.6 - Cheddar (2020-2021)
28.6 - BeIN Sports (2021)
28.6 - BeIN Sports Xtra en Español / BeIN Sports (2021-2021)
28.6 - CBN News Channel (2021-2022)
28.6 - TBD (2022)
28.7 - The Country Network (2016-2017)

References

External links
DTV America
Rabbitears WUDZ-LD

Buzzr affiliates
Movies! affiliates
LX (TV network) affiliates
Mass media in Indianapolis
Low-power television stations in the United States
Innovate Corp.
WUDZ-LD
Television channels and stations established in 2015
2015 establishments in Indiana